Jews Against Zionism: The American Council for Judaism, 1942-1948 is a 1990 book by Thomas A. Kolsky, a professor of history and political science at Montgomery County Community College, based on his doctoral dissertation at The George Washington University.

In Jews Against Zionism, Kolsky describes the history of the American Council for Judaism, an organization specifically created to fight against both Zionism and a Jewish state.

Reviews

 https://www.nytimes.com/1990/10/14/books/israel-haunted.html

See also
 Jewish Anti-Zionism
 Neturei Karta

References

Further reading

External links

Thomas A. Kolsky's Web Page, Montgomery County Community College.

1990 non-fiction books
Books critical of Zionism
Jewish anti-Zionism in the United States
Reform anti-Zionism
History books about Zionism
Anti-Zionism
Anti-Zionism in the United States